Ali Isa (Ali Isa JC; born 4 June 1974) is a Nigerian politician and administrator. He is a former member of Nigeria's House of Representatives, representing the Balanga/Billiri Federal Constituencies of the Gombe state. He was re-elected in the 2023 General election

Birth
Ali Isa was born on 4 June 1974 in the town of Chamasco, Billiri LGA in the Gombe state, Nigeria.

Early life and education 
Ali JC began his education at Pilot Primary School in Chamasco Town and graduated with the First School Leaving Certificate (FSLC) in the year 1986. He later enrolled at the Government Science Secondary School, Billiri and graduated in 1993 with a West African Senior Certificate (WASC). He then proceeded to Federal Polytechnic Bauchi and obtained a diploma in 1998. Ali JC graduated with a Bachelor's degree in Business Administration and a Master's degree in International Relations and Diplomacy from University of Abuja in the year 2008 and 2011 respectively. He then obtained a Diploma Certificate in Management from the University of Nasarawa in 2012.

Political career 
 Member House of Representatives, representing Balanga/Billiri Federal Constituency 2015-2019 under People Democratic Party.
 Re-elected  for the House of Representatives in the 2023 general election

References 

Nigerian politicians
People from Gombe State
1974 births
Living people